Thermador is part of BSH Home Appliances Corporation, a fully owned subsidiary of BSH Hausgeräte GmbH, the second largest appliance manufacturer in the world. The Thermador brand specializes in cooking appliance equipment such as ovens, ranges, cooktops, refrigerators and dishwashers.

History
Thermador invented the first wall oven and cooktop, and introduced stainless steel to home appliances. By 1948, Thermador introduced the first "Pro Range" for residential use. Patterned after commercial restaurant equipment, Thermador developed the first home version warming drawer in 1952, a kitchen appliance that warmed dishes and foods while the oven was in use. Thermador continued to improve on kitchen appliances with the first self-cleaning oven in 1963.

During the 1970s, Thermador continued to innovate,. In 1970, the company released the first "smooth top" cooktop using material developed by Corning Incorporated. Julia Child used a Thermador oven in her critically acclaimed PBS TV series. Thermador appliances were also featured in the American television show The Brady Bunch. In 1976, Thermador introduced the first "Speedcooking" oven, which combined thermal heat with microwave energy to cook up to 35 percent faster than conventional ovens.

Thermador was bought in 1998 by BSH (Bosch und Siemens Hausgeräte), then a joint Bosch-Siemens company, but since 2015 solely owned by the Bosch company.

References

External links
 Official website

Cooking appliance brands
Luxury brands